Omsk Metro is a cancelled rapid transit line that underwent various phases of construction from 1992 to 2018 in Omsk, Russia. It was to become Siberia's second metropolitan underground railway system after the Novosibirsk Metro which opened in the mid-1980s.

Construction of the first line of the Metro suffered from many delays, with the planned opening date being postponed four times: from 2008 to 2010, then 2015, then again to 2016. In May 2018, the regional government of the Omsk Oblast stopped construction after 26 years, leaving behind an unfinished system with only one station that serves as a pedestrian underpass, and a double-decker metro/road bridge over the Irtysh river.

History
Central planners in Moscow first identified Omsk as a metro-eligible city during the 1960s, due to its length along the Irtysh River and its relatively narrow streets.  But after the plan was approved and financed, the planners decided to build an express tram instead, and the money allocated to Omsk was given to Chelyabinsk.  In 1979, a Gosplan commission rejected a plan to build an express tram system since it was predicted to be unable to handle projected passenger flows without severely discomforting riders.  In 1986, metro plans were revisited and financing began, along with the demolition of residential buildings to make way for tracks and a yard.

Construction began in 1992 between the stations Tupolevskaya and Rabochaya. The initial plans involved opening the section between the stations Marshala Zhukova and Rabochaya on the right bank of the Irtysh River to connect downtown to the manufacturing district, and then later to connect the line to the opposite bank of the Irtysh.  Due to poor financial circumstances, by 2003 just the section between Tupolevskaya and Rabochaya was completed (with no intermediate stations). At that time the plans changed and the authorities decided to connect the two banks of the Irtsh with a metro bridge, going between one station on the right bank and three on the left bank.  The combined metro (lower level) and motor-vehicle (upper level) bridge was built and opened to vehicular traffic in 2005.

The current phase of construction involves four stations:
 Biblioteka Imeni Pushkina ( – Pushkin Library)
 Zarechnaya ( – Over the River)
 Kristall
 Sobornaya ( – Cathedral Station)

The average speed is expected to be 36 km/h and travel time along the entire route is expected to be 10 minutes 12 seconds. Daily ridership is projected at 190,000 passengers and yearly ridership at 69 million.

On 2 September 2011, Biblioteka Imeni Pushkina opened to the public as a pedestrian underpass: at the time, metro constructors expected the system to open in the autumn of 2015.

Since 2014, construction on the system had stalled, but an 84.6 million Ruble contract was awarded to the Russian firm Sibmost to carry out detailed design studies on completing the  light metro line, from Biblioteka Pushkina to Prospekt Rokossovskogo, with five stations. On 9 September 2015, it was announced that the construction would continue, in view of the high cost of preserving and maintaining the core structural features of the metro.

Suspension and revival attempts (2018–present) 

According to Meduza on 11 May 2018, the regional government of the Omsk Oblast announced the previous day that they would indefinitely suspend construction on the Omsk Metro after 26 years: the regional government instead allocated ₽80 million (about US$1.3 million in 2018) for the development of a "conservation project" that would try to complete Zarechnaya station, and to maintain the tunnel between Pushkin Library and Zarechnaya. The regional government also announced that they would fill in the foundation pits at Kristall and Sobornaya, and return them to public use.

On 4 October 2022, the regional government announced that they would try to integrate the unfinished system into the city's tram network.

Stations 

The first two phases of the Omsk Metro were expected to deliver one line with ten stations, all of them underground. The 2014 light metro study also included Prospekt Rokossovskogo.

Biblioteka Imeni Pushkina was planned as Krasny Put' ( — Red Way).
Kristall was planned as Bulvar Arkhitektorov ( — Boulevard of the Architects)
Sobornaya was planned as Avtovokzal ( — Bus Terminal).

In popular culture 

Construction delays have made the Omsk Metro a subject of humour in the city: Radio Free Europe/Radio Liberty and Yuri Litvinenko of Atlas Obscura have noted an unofficial map and mobile app that showed only one station (Pushkin Library), as well as souvenir fare tokens for the incomplete system.

References

External links 

 Omsk Metro (official site?)
 Mostovik – general contractor of Omsk metro 
 Omsk Metro at UrbanRail.net

Omsk
Underground rapid transit in Russia
Proposed public transport in Russia
Cancelled rapid transit lines and systems